The 2023  PBA Tour season, the 64th season of play for the U.S. Professional Bowlers Association's ten-pin bowling tour, began on January 29 with the pre-tournament qualifier (PTQ) of the U.S. Open.

Season overview
On November 1, 2022, the PBA released the 2023 schedule, including Fox and FS1 broadcasts. For the first time in PBA history, the final rounds of all five major events will be broadcast live on over-the-air network television (Fox network). The PBA also announced that match play rounds for multiple tournaments will be broadcast on FS1, another PBA first. In addition, the 2023 season schedule includes nine standard singles title events and two doubles title events that will have final rounds broadcast on FS1 or live-streamed (some broadcasts are TBA).

Following the U.S. Open finals broadcast on February 5, other major finals broadcasts include the Tournament of Champions on March 19, the USBC Masters on April 2, the PBA World Championship on April 23 (part of the World Series of Bowling in Wauwatosa, Wisconsin that also includes three standard title events), and the PBA Players Championship on May 14. Fox will also broadcast the PBA Super Slam finals on May 21, This special event will feature all major tournament winners from the 2023 season. The five majors and the Super Slam will each pay out a $100,000 top prize.

In February-March, there will also be five "Classic Series" tour stops each awarding a standard PBA singles title. The top eight points earners from these five events will be invited to compete in a special, non-title Skill Ball Challenge event on July 22–23. In that event, all eight players must use an identical Skill 3.02 bowling ball, which was introduced at the Teen Masters championships.

The PBA Elias Cup team competition, previously a summer event, has been moved to the fall, with the finals broadcast scheduled for September 27 on FS1.

Tournament summary
The events currently scheduled for the 2023 PBA season are shown below. Major tournaments are in bold. Career PBA title numbers for winners are shown in parenthesis (#). Winner's share prize money is shown in US dollars ($), except where indicated.

Tour points are awarded for most events. Besides the season-ending Harry Smith PBA Points Winner award, points are one consideration for Player of the Year voting and also affect eligibility and seeding for the PBA Tour Finals (with 2022 points) and the PBA Tour Playoffs. 

 Tier 3: PBA short format or limited field tournaments (2500 points for first, and descending thereafter)
 Tier 2: PBA standard tournaments with a fully open field (double the points of Tier 3 events)
 Tier 1: PBA major tournaments (triple the points of Tier 3 events)

References

External links
Season Schedule

Professional Bowlers Association seasons
2023 in bowling
Bowling